The Mufushan National Forest Park is a "National Level Forest Park" located in Hunan Province, in the southern People's Republic of China.

It is located in the Mufu Mountains.

History
Mufu Mountains (MuFu Shan) may be translated as "Camp Mountains". Soldiers took refuge on the mountain in the time of the Ping Jiang Uprising (1928), and in earlier conflicts.

References

External links
  —Official Mufushan National Forest Park website  
 Terryking.us: Mufushan National Forest Park — park brochure.

Parks in Hunan
Forests of China
Tourist attractions in Hunan
Forest parks in China